The Southgate–Lewis House is located one mile east of the Texas State Capitol in Austin, Texas, at 1501 East 12th Street. The house was constructed in 1888, and now stands as an African-American historical landmark. It is also a repository for African-American History and Culture in the region of east Austin, which historically became an African-American neighborhood. The City of Austin has now declared this region to be "Austin's Black Cultural District." The Southgate–Lewis House is located in the center of the "African American Cultural Heritage District".

The Southgate–Lewis House was constructed by the builder Robert C. Lambie in 1888, as the residence for the publisher and bookbinder John Southgate, whose business was located on Congress Avenue, next door to the Lundberg Bakery. In its area it is notable for its period, scale, and complexity. Its restored late Victorian house style is unique among local simple vernacular buildings.

The Charles M. Lewis family owned the house from 1913 to 1979. Following the death of Marguerite Mae Dee Lewis in 1970, the house was abandoned for nearly a decade. The house fell into decline, and because it became a danger to the community, the house was scheduled for demolition. The house was saved one week before demolition, and then restored and preserved.

The Southgate–Lewis House is now a city, state, and national historic landmark. In 1986, the house was presented to the W. H. Passon Historical Society as a gift, by a professor at The University of Texas at Austin. The objective of the W. H. Passon Historical Society is to secure and preserve materials and artifacts related to Black culture, in Austin and Travis County.

Landmark status designation and recognition 
 1979 – Designated a City of Austin landmark
 1980 – Awarded the Heritage Society of Austin Historic Preservation Award
 1985 – Designated a landmark by the National Register of Historic Places
 1987 – Recognized by the State of Texas 70th Legislature, Resolution No. 141, for ensuring the legacy of Black heritage in Austin  
 1987 – Awarded the "Helping Hands Award for Community Service" by the Texas Association for the Study of Afro-American Life and History
1988 – Designated a Recorded Texas Historic Landmark

Gallery

Architecture

National Register of Historic Places 
The National Register of Historic Places describes the architectural style as "High Victorian" Gothic Revival. The house has projecting eaves and gables and a prominent front bay with a denticulated cornice. The siding and trim are unusually ornate and varied. A continuous band of vertical siding at the base of the structure is capped with a horizontal band at the window sill. Drop siding occurs up to the sills of the second story windows, above which multiple rows of fish-scale and rectangular shingles alternate. Ornamental bargeboard trim with brackets is located at the eave line, and the roof is wood shingle. Two brick chimneys rise far above the cedar shake roof. A dormer on the west elevation has diagonal support brackets for the overhang and crossed bargeboard trim. There are 22 double hung windows.

Interior floor plan 
The first floor interior of the house is composed of five rooms. From the front door one enters the main entry hall, which contains the stairway balustrade that leads to the second floor. From the foyer one can enter the main parlor via a door on the right. The parlor contains a fireplace (and functional chimney) with a mantle and brightly colored tiles arranged in a complex non-repeating geometrical pattern. A pair of very large wooden double-doors (that slide into pockets) separate the first parlor from the second parlor. The second parlor has one door which leads to a wrap-around exterior covered porch and another door that leads to a formal dining room.  The dining room is completely lined with tongue and groove beaded boards (ceiling and walls) with wainscoting that wraps around all four walls. The dining room then leads to a small kitchen. The kitchen has a door that opens to the wrap-around exterior covered porch. The staircase in the main entry hall leads upstairs to the second floor, which is composed of three bedrooms, a small closet, a small bathroom, and a large hallway with a balustrade surrounding the stairwell. From the hallway, a large window opens onto a small exterior balcony.

History

Robertson Hill 
Joseph William Robertson (1809–1870) is the patriarch of the family after whom Robertson Hill was named. Robertson was a physician, a Texas Ranger, and a member of the House of Representatives in the Fourth Congress of the Republic of Texas. He established a pharmaceutical business and a medical practice on Congress Avenue. He was elected mayor of Austin in 1843. Robertson is buried in Oakwood Cemetery, two blocks from the Southgate–Lewis House. In 1848, Robertson purchased a large tract of land from Dubois de Saligny one half mile east of the city center (which included a home that is now known as The French Legation). Robertson and his son, George L. Robertson, began actively subdividing the family property and selling lots. This region (which includes the Southgate–Lewis House) became known as Robertson Hill.

College Street in 1873 
The "Bird's Eye View of the City of Austin," shown herein, was created by Augustus Koch in 1873. The map provides an interesting historical perspective for our modern day consideration of the Southgate–Lewis House, on many different levels of analysis. The Southgate–Lewis House was constructed only 15 years after this map was created. In 1888 the population of Austin was somewhere between 10 and 15 thousand people. In comparison, the population of San Francisco at that time, where comparable houses were quite common, was a little under 300,000.

Judging from this old map, Congress Avenue and College Street were the main streets of Austin; both streets converge upon (or radiate out from) what was the center of the city at that point in time – namely, the State Capitol Building. College Street was a large street (a main street) leading directly from the center of the State Capital Building up into the Robertson Hill area, where homes were being constructed. The only comparable street heading east is the street near Cherry Street, which to this day leads up the hill into the Oakwood Cemetery. The point is: This "Bird's Eye View" reveals that College Street was a main street. The Southgate–Lewis House was constructed on this main street.

Street names change 
On September 21, 1886, the street names in Austin were changed to numbers and College Street became 12th Street. Further, Congress Avenue was designated as the dividing line for naming the numbered streets East vs West. The Southgate–Lewis House is located at 1501 East 12th Street.

John Southgate 
John Southgate was a bookbinder and publisher in Austin, Texas with a business at 1008 Congress Avenue, right next door to Charles Lundberg's Bakery at 1006 Congress Avenue, only a few steps away from the Texas State Capital building. Southgate had more than thirty years of experience working in both England as well as in the United States, in establishments such as Daniel Appleton & Company (a firm which was founded in 1825 and whose successor lives on as Appleton-Century-Crofts). In the late 1800s the Austin American Statesman made numerous remarks praising the work of John Southgate. For example: "Mr. John Southgate has just completed an 850-page ledger, which is a beautiful specimen of the bookbinder's art. It is handsomely bound, and in finish and workmanship cannot be excelled any where [sic]" (April 12, 1988, Page 3); "The Statesman commends Mr. Southgate as an honest, faithful man, and one whose business engagements will be punctiliously complied with" (April 29, 1884, Page 4).  Southgate eventually associated with the Eugene Von Boeckmann Publishing Company.

Robert C. Lambie 
Robert C. Lambie was contracted by John Southgate to build the home in 1888. Lambie (with his stonemason partner Francis Fischer) built many historic structures in Texas, including: (a) the First Engineering Building at The University of Texas at Austin (b) the historic home and studio of the iconoclastic German sculptor Elisabet Ney, now the Elisabet Ney Museum (shown herein), (c) the Old Main Building at Texas State University (shown herein), and (d) the Hays County Courthouse (shown herein).

Lambie was famous for his elaborate woodwork, as evidenced by the balustrades, ornate door molding, window molding, finial pendants, and the beautifully elaborate plinth blocks within the Southgate–Lewis House. Quoting the State of Texas Legislature:  "the Southgate–Lewis Home at the corner of East 12th and Comal Streets in Austin .... [contains] one of the finest staircases in all of Austin".

Lewis family habitation

Charles M. Lewis and Marguerite Mae Dee Lewis 
The Charles M. Lewis family owned the house from 1913 to 1970. Charles M. Lewis was a prominent Black citizen in Austin. Mr. Lewis was a professor at Samuel Huston College, and Marguerite Mae Dee Lewis (his daughter) was a teacher at L.C. Anderson High School,  which at the time was located only two blocks from the house. The photograph of Mae Dee Lewis that hangs on the wall within the Southgate–Lewis House today is shown herein. The photograph caption reads as follows: "Mae D. Lewis, Spanish Teacher, OLCA High School, Class of 1957". The acronym OLCA stands for "Old Laurine Cecil Anderson". Laurine Cecil Anderson was most famous for his teachings and being a school administrator in Texas; he founded the Colored Teachers State Association of Texas. Old Laurine Cecil Anderson High School was located only a few blocks from the Southgate–Lewis House.

Robertson Hill High School and Laurine Cecil Anderson 
It is worth noting here (from the records of W. H. Passon) that prior to 1907 this school was entitled Robertson Hill High School. High School Classes for African-American students were initiated in Austin within the Robertson Hill High School in 1889. In 1896 Laurine Cecil Anderson resigned his position at Prairie View to become principal of Austin's Robertson Hill High School. Then, in 1907 the school became E.H. Anderson High School and finally the school was renamed in honor of Lauren Cecil Anderson in 1938. Lauren Cecil Anderson was a neighbor and family friend of the DeBlanc family and he used to lend books to Ada Marie DeBlanc Simond. Marguerite Mae Dee Lewis, the Lewis family as a whole, and their life during their time in the Southgate–Lewis House, have been immortalized in a series of children's books written by Ada Marie DeBlanc Simond (see below).

Saving the condemned Southgate–Lewis House

Condemnation and demolition 
After the death of Ms. Lewis in 1970, the house was abandoned for nearly a decade and as a result the house fell into dramatic disrepair. Among other problems, most of the windows were broken and the roof was missing in many locations; thus water had been entering the house for some long time. Pigeons had taken up residence in the house.  Because it was a danger to the community, "it was a condemned building scheduled for demolition."

Professor discovers condemned house 
A professor had just moved to Austin after living in Berkeley, California, for his first thirty years. Having just completed his Ph.D. at the University of California in Berkeley, he had now become a new assistant professor at The University of Texas at Austin. The professor was looking for a home and he noticed the abandoned dilapidated Victorian house (which is only a few blocks east from the university) one week before the scheduled demolition date, in February 1979.  (At this point in time, the house belonged to Mary Elizabeth Lovelady, for reasons unknown.)

Community supports restoration  
The professor set out to save the house, to restore the house, and to make the house his home. He was aided by a grant from The Heritage Society of Austin (now named Preservation Austin). Elaine Mayo, the Executive Director of the Heritage Society was very supportive of the project. David Hoffman, the well-established historic preservation architect with the firm Bell, Klein and Hoffman, provided much needed advice. Charles Betts extended his faith in the project and as a consequence Franklin Savings provided the necessary loan. It is interesting to note that Charles Betts and Franklin Savings were located in a very grand historic Austin building – The Walter Tips Building on Congress Avenue, a City, State, and National Landmark. A special type of loan was required during the period of the restoration work and this loan was arranged by Randy Peschel who was at the City National Bank of Austin.

Restoration of the Southgate–Lewis House

Restoration craftsman 
Peter J. Fears was the craftsman in charge of the restoration work. Fears had just completed an exemplary restoration of the historic Limerick-Frazier House, only a few blocks away on 13th Street. Fears moved into the restored home with his family. The Limerick-Frazier House, located at 810 East 13th Street, was constructed in 1876.

When Peter Fears began the restoration, he discovered a structural feature of the house that probably helped preserve the structural integrity of the house during its extended period of deterioration, particularly with all of the damage on the roof. Fears was happy to discover a somewhat surprising fact about the carpentered framing of the Southgate–Lewis House – all of the interior walls were reinforced with long and wide diagonal boards.

Interior wall diagonal shiplap 
When unsalvageable water-damaged wallpaper was removed, Fears discovered that the interior walls were not composed of the usual "lath and plaster," which was so common in the late 19th century Victorian buildings, but instead covered with shiplap laid diagonally, at an angle of 45 degrees relative to the frame, much as external sheathing is, making the structure quite stiff, resistant to gusts of wind (which are quite common in the region).

Calcasieu lumber 
The interior wall diagonal shiplap boards were stamped by the lumberyard, "Calcasieu Lumber Co". Calcasieu was founded in 1883, only a few years prior to the construction of the house. Calcasieu began downtown along the Colorado river between Guadalupe and Lavaca and grew to occupy six city blocks in the 1950s. Calcasieu Lumber Company lives on to this day. The Calcasieu Lumber Co. was "named after the top-quality lumber that came from Calcasieu Parish, Louisiana" – in particular, the longleaf pine.

Unexpected treasures

Treasures 
The restoration work on the interior of the Southgate–Lewis House revealed many unexpected treasures: a beautiful elaborate staircase balustrade, beaded tongue-in-groove (tongue and groove) hardwood paneling, patterned brass hardware, wainscotting, wood floors from old-growth heartwood longleaf pine, from the Calcasieu Pine District of Louisiana.

Floorplan alterations 
The restoration craftsman (Peter J. Fears) along with the restoration architect (David Hoffman) concluded that the house had not undergone any major changes in the basic floor plan since its original construction, with one exception. It seems reasonable to conclude, based upon a variety of structural clues, that the small kitchen was not part of the original structure created by Robert C. Lambie for John Southgate.

A home once again 
Following the restoration of the Southgate–Lewis House, the professor moved into the home with his family.

Donation to the Passon Society 
After living in the home for a long time, encouraged by Ada Marie DeBlanc Simond, the professor donated the Southgate–Lewis House to the W. H. Passon Historical Society in December 1986. The goal of the Passon Society is to secure and preserve materials (journals, books, periodicals, exhibits, et cetera) related to African-American Black history and to establish an educational center for the purpose of research into the topic and the acquisition of related knowledge. The Southgate–Lewis House seemed like the ideal home for the W. H. Passon Historical Society, and reciprocally, the W. H. Passon Historical Society seemed like the ideal steward for the historic preservation of the Southgate–Lewis House.

W. H. Passon Historical Society

Purpose and goal 
The W. H. Passon Historical Society is an organization that strives to secure and preserve materials and artifacts related to Black culture in Austin and Travis County, Texas. The Society was founded by Ada Marie DeBlanc Simond (with Janie Beatrice Perry Harrison and Fannie Mae Murphy Lawless). The Society was first organized in 1975 (by Ada Simond) and then chartered by the State of Texas in 1979. The stated purpose is "To unite all individuals within and without the Black Community who have a genuine interest in the Past, and an eagerness to discover the depth and breadth of the Black Experience in Austin and Travis County." The stated goal is "To secure, preserve and legitimize events, documents and artifacts related to the Black Culture in Austin and Travis County [and to] recognize and reward the efforts of individuals and organizations which protect, enhance and reflect respect for the Black Heritage of our community."

The Southgate–Lewis House 
The Southgate–Lewis House is now the home of the W. H. Passon Historical Society. The objective of the historical society for the Southgate–Lewis House is "to establish an educational center including books, journals, exhibits, periodicals, and other materials by and about Black People for the purpose of research and to broaden the knowledge of the citizenry relative to the contributions of Black People. The Southgate–Lewis House stands as an important African-American Historical Landmark and as a repository for African-American history and culture.

Wesley H. Passon

Educator 
Wesley H. Passon (1864–1933) was a Black educator who made many important contributions toward the preservation of African-American history, most notably a summary of the history of the African-American population in Austin, Texas. In 1894, Mr. Passon was elected to the position of principle of the school in Wheatville Texas, which was the first Black community associated with Austin after the Civil War, located just west of The University of Texas at Austin. The community of Wheatville was founded in 1867 by James Wheat, a former slave from Arkansas. The location that was once Wheatville (24th street to 26th street, Rio Grande street to the shoal creek) is now primarily student housing and it contains the majority of all of the sororities and fraternities at The University of Texas at Austin. W. H. Passon then went on to serve as principle of many other early schools of Austin Texas such as Blackshear School which: "opened in 1891 to provide free public education to African-American children in the community." He was the principal of West Austin School, Clarksville School, Olive Street School, and Gregory Town. Two journals record the daily affairs of the West Austin School and the Clarksville School from 1908 to 1918.

Historian 
In 1907, W. H. Passon provided a comprehensive historical record for the Metropolitan African Methodist Episcopal Church in Austin that has since become an essential resource for scholars and others to this very day. For example: In September 2000, the City of Austin Texas Historic Resources Survey of East Austin, stated that "One of the most important secondary sources obtained for historical research in East Austin was the 1907 Metropolitan African Methodist Episcopal (A.M.E.) ... [book] ... compiled by historian W. H. Passon: The Historical and Biographical Souvenir and Program of the 25th Anniversary of Metropolitan AME Church, Austin, Texas 1882-1907".

Ada Marie DeBlanc Simond

The Charles M. Lewis family 
Ada Marie DeBlanc Simond (1903–1989) was an African-American teacher, writer, historian, and public health activist who grew up in the neighborhood of the Southgate–Lewis House (and continued to live in the neighborhood throughout her life).  She was a staunch and powerful advocate for the historic preservation of the Southgate–Lewis House. Ada Simond knew the Charles M. Lewis family quite well; she was a friend of Mae Dee Lewis and she frequented the Southgate–Lewis House often. Charles M. Lewis was also a close friend and mentor and he allowed Ada Simond to audit classes at Samuel Huston College (where he was a professor).  Later she would go on to acquire a master's degree at Iowa State University.

Six-book series 
Ada Simond used the Lewis family and the Southgate–Lewis House as inspiration for a series of children's books relating to Black history in East Austin. She published a series of six children's books entitled Let's Pretend: Mae Dee and Her Family (beginning with Let's Pretend: Mae Dee and Her Family Go to Town in 1977), in which she told historically accurate stories of Black families living in Austin in the early 1900s. These books are "narrated by Mae Dee Lewis, whom Simond identified as a childhood friend." The six-book series was named "Outstanding Publication on a History Subject" by the Texas Historical Commission in 1979. Ada Simond also wrote a weekly column for The Austin American Statesman for several years entitled "Looking Back," which highlighted the historical roots of Austin's African-American community.

Academic background 
Ada Simond holds a master's degree in home economics from Iowa State University and she taught at Tillotson College between 1936 and 1942. In 1982 Huston-Tillotson College conferred upon her a Doctor of Humane Letters. She was a lifetime member of the National Association for the Advancement of Colored People and the National Council of Negro Women.  She has received numerous awards: e.g., The Black Heritage Award from the Austin Independent School District, and The Human Relations Award from the Texas State Teachers Association.

George Washington Carver Museum 
Ada Simond cofounded the George Washington Carver Museum, which opened in a historic building that was once the site of Austin's first Black library. The Carver Museum is located only two blocks away from the Southgate–Lewis House. In addition to the awards mentioned above Ada Simond also received the Arthur B. DeWitty Award for "outstanding effort and achievement in human rights". She was inducted into the Texas Women's Hall of Fame in 1986. The City of Austin, Texas has named a street in her honor.

W. H. Passon Society 
In 1975, Ada Simond organized the W. H. Passon Historical Society to help secure and preserve the history of Austin's African-American community.

Juneteenth National Independence Day 
On June 19, 2021, the annual Juneteenth Celebration became the newest federal holiday: officially, Juneteenth National Independence Day (Jubilee Day, Emancipation Day, Freedom Day, and Black Independence). This traditional annual celebration commemorates the ending of slavery in the United States – the emancipation of enslaved African Americans. A photograph of the Southgate–Lewis House shows how the home of the W. H. Passon Historical Society was utilized on the very day the new Juneteenth National Independence Day was celebrated. The banners on the west elevation of the house (shown herein) depict distinguished African Americans in Government, Education, Literature, Medicine, and Sports. The banners on the north elevation (shown herein) depict distinguished African Americans in Religion and the Military.

Association with educators 
Throughout its long history, the Southgate–Lewis House has been associated with educators of one sort or another. The history of the house begins with the bookbinder, John Southgate. (Books are certainly associated with education.)  Charles Lewis and Mae Dee Lewis were both educators. The University of Texas professor was an educator. Wesley H. Passon was a distinguished Black educator. And finally, the purpose of the W. H. Passon Historical Society is to "establish an educational center".

References

External links

Houses on the National Register of Historic Places in Texas
Houses in Austin, Texas
Museums in Austin, Texas
African-American museums in Texas
Religious museums in Texas
1888 establishments in Texas
National Register of Historic Places in Austin, Texas
Recorded Texas Historic Landmarks
City of Austin Historic Landmarks